Nadya Ochner (born 14 March 1993) is an Italian snowboarder, specializing in Alpine snowboarding.

Biography
Ochner competed at the 2014 Winter Olympics for Italy. She was 26th in the qualifying run of the parallel giant slalom, and 22nd in the qualifying round of the parallel slalom, not advancing in either event.

As of September 2014, her best showing at the World Championships is 14th, in the 2013 parallel slalom.

Ochner made her World Cup debut in March 2010. As of September 2014, her best finish is 4th, in a pair of events. Her best overall finish is 18th, in 2011–12.

References

External links

1993 births
Living people
Olympic snowboarders of Italy
Snowboarders at the 2014 Winter Olympics
Snowboarders at the 2018 Winter Olympics
Snowboarders at the 2022 Winter Olympics
Sportspeople from Merano
Italian female snowboarders
Universiade medalists in snowboarding
Universiade bronze medalists for Italy
Competitors at the 2015 Winter Universiade
Snowboarders of Fiamme Oro
21st-century Italian women